Mladen Victor Wickerhauser was born in Zagreb, SR Croatia, in 1959. He is a graduate of the California Institute of Technology and Yale University.

He is currently a professor of Mathematics and of Biomedical Engineering at Washington University in St. Louis. He has six U.S. patents and more than 100 publications. One of these, "Entropy-based Algorithms for Best Basis Selection," led to the Wavelet Scalar Quantization (WSQ) image compression algorithm, used by the FBI to encode fingerprint images.

Wickerhauser has been a member of the American Mathematical Society and the Society for Industrial and Applied Mathematics and has received the 2002 Wavelet Pioneer Award from SPIE (The International Society for Optical Engineering).

He is of Austrian descent.

Selected works 
 Adapted Wavelet Analysis from Theory to Software (A K Peters, 1994) 
 Mathematics for Multimedia (Elsevier 2003) (Birkhaeuser 2009)

References

External links 
 
M. Victor Wickerhauser
"Entropy-based Algorithms for Best Basis Selection"
U.S. Patent No. 5,384,725
 U.S. Patent No. 5,526,299
 U.S. Patent No. 6,792,073
 U.S. Patent No. 7,054,454
 U.S. Patent No. 7,333,619
 U.S. Patent No. 8,500,644

1959 births
Living people
20th-century American mathematicians
21st-century American mathematicians
California Institute of Technology alumni
Yale University alumni
Washington University in St. Louis faculty
Washington University in St. Louis mathematicians
Yugoslav emigrants to the United States
Scientists from Zagreb